Candi Lee CdeBaca (born April 10, 1986) is the Councilor for the 9th district of the Denver City Council. She is a member of the Democratic Party and the Democratic Socialists of America.

Life and career
CdeBaca was born in Swansea, in a neighborhood of Denver between rail lines and the Interstate 70. As a teenager, she came home one day to find her mother stuck in the street, unable to maneuver her wheelchair over a ramp-less curb. This experience led her to become an activist. In 2006, she co-founded Project VOYCE (Voices of Youth Changing Education), in response to the closure of her school, and helped to organize a class-action lawsuit against Denver Public Schools. CdeBaca was valedictorian and class president at Manual High School, and a first-generation high school graduate. Eventually, she earned bachelor's and master's degrees simultaneously from the University of Denver, then left for Washington, D.C., to work in education advocacy. She returned to Denver in 2014, and once again became involved in local politics.

Denver City Council

CdeBaca was branded a communist, for the anti-capitalist remarks she made during a candidate forum on April 7, 2019, advocating for "community ownership of land, labor, resources, and distribution of those resources." In the days afterwards, the video was shared widely on right-wing news sites, and CdeBaca reportedly received hundreds of death and rape threats. Albus Brooks, the incumbent councilor for the 9th district, was defeated by CdeBaca in a runoff election on June 4, 2019. Ahead of her swearing-in, CdeBaca clarified in an interview that she did not identify as a communist, would have preferred to run unaffiliated, and considered herself to be an anarchist.

She has faced pushback against a controversial tweet (February 28, 2020), in which she appeared to express support for the idea of spreading coronavirus at a Trump rally. A spokesperson claimed it was a "sarcastic tweet, to call attention to the Trump administration’s downplaying of the coronavirus pandemic as a ‘hoax’ no more dangerous than the common flu."

In 2022, CdeBaca was one of two Denver City Council members who opposed the conversion of a Denver golf course into housing and mixed-use development.

See also
List of Democratic Socialists of America who have held office in the United States

References

Colorado Democrats
Living people
Women city councillors in Colorado
21st-century American politicians
21st-century American women politicians
Denver City Council members
Democratic Socialists of America politicians from Colorado
American anarchists
American anti-capitalists
1986 births
University of Denver alumni